MegaFon, previously known as North-West GSM, is the second largest mobile phone operator and the third largest telecom operator in Russia. It works in the GSM, UMTS and LTE standard.  The company serves 62.1 million subscribers in Russia and 1.6 million in Tajikistan. It is headquartered in Moscow.

In 2002 the company changed its name from North-West GSM to MegaFon when it acquired several regional companies, becoming the first GSM company in Russia to cover all its territory. The name "MegaFon" in Russian is spelled and pronounced exactly like the Russian word for megaphone; other connotations are mega- as "big" and fon as "telephone".

History
June 17, 1993, was the registration date of NorthWest GSM CJSC (Saint Petersburg). Alexander Malyshev became the first General Director. The major international investors included Scandinavian companies Sonera (Finland), Telia International AB (Sweden) and Telenor Invest AS (Norway). Telecommunication equipment was supplied by Nokia.

1994 – launch of commercial operation of GSM (2G) network, the first in Russia.

1999 – number of the company's subscribers became over 100,000. By that time the network of the North-West GSM had completely covered Saint Petersburg and Leningrad region, it was also actively expanding in the northern areas of the Russian North-West.

July 1999 – North-West GSM was the first Russian operator that signed roaming agreements with all countries in Europe. The same year, for the first time ever in Russia, mobile communication started to operate in Saint Petersburg metro, and the operator's spectrum of value-added services included WAP-access to the Internet.

2000 – shareholders of the company adopted a new strategy that was targeted at the mass market.

November 2001 – number of North-West GSM subscribers exceeded 500,000.

May 2002 – The number of North-West GSM subscribers exceeded  1 million.

May 7, 2002 – in the course of rebranding North-West GSM CJSC was renamed to MegaFon OJSC. Rebranding of the company was started on April 28, 2002, by change of the logo. At that moment, North-West GSM was merged with Sonic Duo CJSC (Moscow), Ural GSM CJSC (Yekaterinburg), Mobicom-Kavkaz CJSC (Krasnodar), Mobicom-Center CJSC, Mobicom-Novosibirsk CJSC, Mobicom-Khabarovsk CJSC, MCS-Povolzhie OJSC, Volzhsky GSM (Saransk, Republic of Mordovia).

On October 2, 2007, MegaFon launched for operation the first Russian fragment of the third generation network in IMT-2000/UMTS (3G) at the territory of Saint Petersburg and Leningrad region. For the first time ever in this country the radio access sub-system UTRAN (UMTS Terrestrial Radio Access Network) was launched for trial commercial operation and included 30 base stations. And already on October 24, 2007, MegaFon announced about start of 3G service in Saint Petersburg and Leningrad region. For the first time in Russia, the following services became available for mass users: Internet access at the data transmission speed that is ten times higher than in the existing GSM networks (2G and 2,5G) of GPRS/EDGE technology, high-quality Mobile TV, video communication.

December 2008 – the extraordinary General Shareholders Meeting of MegaFon took a resolution on reorganization of MegaFon OJSC in the form of its merger with Sonic Duo CJSC (Moscow), Ural GSM CJSC (Yekaterinburg), Mobicom-Kavkaz CJSC (Krasnodar), Mobicom-Center CJSC, Mobicom-Novosibirsk CJSC, Mobicom-Khabarovsk CJSC, MCS-Povolzhie OJSC. The number of subscribers exceeded 43.2 million.

On March 16, 2009, MegaFon founded a virtual mobile network operator "PROSTO" (Just for Communication) on the basis of the Stolichny Branch.

On July 1, 2009, reorganization was completed, and now mobile communication services in Russia are provided by the North-West, Stolichny, Kavkaz, Center, Volga, Ural, Siberia and Far East branches of MegaFon OJSC.

On September 25, 2009, it was announced about rebranding of TT mobile CJSC, subsidiary of MegaFon that provided telecom services under the brand of MLT – "Mobile Lines of Tajikistan". The new company's name is MegaFon-Tajikistan.

Since March 1, 2010, Ostelecom CJSC started to provide telecom services in the Tskhinvali region (occupied territory of Georgia) under MegaFon brand.

In June 2010, MegaFon acquired 100% shares of Synterra company, which was a move to strengthen network infrastructure and enhance the positions in the markets of long-distance communication, fixed and mobile broadband access to the Internet, as well as convergence services.<ref>"MegaFon" buy "Synterra" ''</ref>

Three months later, the extraordinary General Shareholders Meeting of MegaFon unanimously approved acquisition of 100% shares of PeterStar CJSC from Synterra.

Based on the results of Q3 2010 MegaFon became the second-ranked operator in mobile revenue."MegaFon S.A. 3rd Quarter Results"  Bloomberg

Based on Q3 2010 results MegaFon became the leader in the revenue share from value-added services (VAS) among the Big Three operators.

As a result of 2010, MegaFon became the Top 2 operator (after MTS) in number subscribers among the Russian cellular communication providers."MegaFon sees FY10 revenues increase 18.5% to RUB215.5 billion" TeleGeography

As a result of 2010, MegaFon acquired the Top Second position in terms of revenue among the Russian Big Three operators."Серебро для "Мегафона" Vedomosti

On July 20, 2011, it was announced about rebranding of TT mobile CJSC. MLT brand was renamed to MegaFon-Tajikistan.

In November 2011, MegaFon signed a partnership agreement with Scartel on joint development of the Fourth Generation networks LTE (Long Term Evolution) in Russia. As a result, the company got the opportunity to provide LTE 4G services using Scartel's equipment. In its turn, Scartel will be able to use MegaFon's infrastructure.

In December 2011, the company created MegaLabs, 100% subsidiary, which is the single center of design and launch of value-added services."МегаФон" выводит MegaLabs" Sotovik.ru

In August 2012 MegaFon released its first smartphone called Megafon Mint in Russia with the new Intel Atom (system on chip). In December 2013 the company received a licence for cable television broadcasting.

In January 2014 the company has launched international roaming data networks in the fourth generation. The first countries where service is available are Switzerland and South Korea. The same month MegaFon CEO Ivan Tavrin obtained a 12% stake of VK.com, Russia's most popular social networking website, from VK's founder Pavel Durov.

In February 2014 board of directors of MegaFon has approved a deal to buy a 100% voting stake in SMARTS Volgograd, a unit of mobile firm SMARTS which covers the Volga and central regions of the country.

In the same month, MegaFon commercially launched fragment network LTE Advanced (LTE-A) within the Garden Ring in Moscow. Formerly MegaFon network tested LTE-A in the 2014 Winter Olympics in Sochi. For this Megafon uses bands in the range 2600 MHz own unique combination of frequency spectrum and network resource of Skartel as a mobile virtual network operator (MVNO).

In March 2022 MegaFon is expelled from the GSMA association.

Hardware branding
Starting in 2015, the company began production of hardware under "MegaFon" brand. These include fixed and mobile phones

Ownership
The company went public in 2012, listing on stock exchanges in Moscow and London. In July 2018, the company's board of directors announced that being a public company was no longer considered a strategic priority and that it would seek to repurchase its GDRs shares from the market and delist, initially from the London Stock Exchange. GDRs were delisted in London in October 2018. The GDR repurchase consolidated more than 75% of ownership in the company, which triggered a mandatory offer to minority shareholders in December 2018. Shares were delisted from the Moscow Exchange in June 2019. Formally shares in the company are now split between USM Telecom (43.68%) and a wholly owned USM subsidiary, AF Telecom Holding (56.32%).

Outside Russia

Georgia

The Georgian National Communications Commission (GNCC) has accused MegaFon of illegal business operations and participation in the military and economic annexation of Georgia.

According to the GNCC, MegaFon has provided unlicensed mobile phone coverage in the conflict zones of Georgia beginning in 2005, in particular the South Ossetia region. The company covered mostly the areas of dislocation of the Russian military forces present in Georgia under the CIS peacekeeping mandate. The rest of the area was mostly covered by the Georgian mobile phone carriers "Geocell" Ltd. and "Magticom". In the spring of 2008, GNCC received complaints from Georgian mobile communication companies regarding the destruction of their communication facilities in the region and installation of MegaFon antennas. The GNCC conducted survey monitoring trips to establish the presence of MegaFon's unlicensed coverage.

The GNCC imposed two fines on MegaFon: the first in the amount of 5,000 GEL ($3,750) in July 2008, and the second, for the recurrence of violation, in the amount of 500,000 GEL (approx. $350,000) in September 2008.

Because Georgian law envisages criminal liability for illegal business activities, the GNCC has notified the General Prosecutor of Georgia on the alleged violations committed by MegaFon. The Prosecutor General of Georgia was expected to initiate criminal proceedings against key officials of MegaFon.

On October 2, 2008, Tbilisi City Court upheld the GNCC's decision, finding MegaFon liable for providing unlicensed telecommunication services in Georgia. MegaFon's appeal of the second administrative fine was to be heard by Tbilisi City Court in November 2008.

Tajikistan
MegaFon's only subsidiary outside Russia is Tajikistan's TT Mobile.

UzbekistanKommersant reported on September 7, 2006, that MegaFon is negotiating in buying an 85% stake in Uzbek mobile operator Coscom from the MCT Corporation. The other 15% stake in Coscom would be held by Coscom management and private shareholders. Analysts estimated Coscom is worth between US$180–200 million. Coscom's has over 300,000 customers.

IranBBC Persian'' reported on May 13, 2008, that Megafon had opened an office in Tehran.

Sponsorship
 KHL hockey league
 For the 2009 Formula One season, MegaFon was one of the sponsors for the Renault F1 Team.
 Megafon was a national partner for 2014 Winter Olympics in Sochi in 2014
 Russian e-sports team Virtus Pro
 English Premier League team Everton- Suspended

Criticism 

By November 2012 MegaFon received a number of orders from Russian telecommunication and consumer market authorities to amend contracts with its 63 million subscribers and to make these contracts compliant with requirements of Russian law. All MegaFon's attempts to challenge these orders in Russian arbitration courts were unsuccessful.

Also in 2012, several arbitration cases in Russian courts ruled that MegaFon violated consumer rights.

MegaFon did not meet requirements of Russian legislation and did not report any legally required certificates of compliance to the Federal Communications Agency Rossvyaz.

On 28 January Liberal Democrat MPs called for sanctions to be imposed on Russian oligarchs, linked to British football clubs (including MegaFon executive Alisher Usmanov and Chelsea owner Roman Abramovich) in response to the poisoning of Russian Opposition figure Alexei Navalny.

References

 Helsingin Sanomat 28 March 2006 
 Russia at Heart of German Probe – Moscow Times July 26, 2005
European Commission to investigate TeliaSonera deals in Russia – Helsingin Sanomat 28 March 2006

External links
MegaFon English corporate site

Telecommunications companies of Russia
Mobile phone companies of Russia
Companies based in Moscow
Russian brands
Telecommunications companies established in 2002
Companies listed on the Moscow Exchange